Christina Nicola Costanza (born August 23, 1995) is an American singer, songwriter, and musician. She is best known as the lead vocalist and primary songwriter of the pop rock band Against The Current.

Early life 
Costanza was born on August 23, 1995, in New Jersey into an Italian American family. She has a younger brother named Michael. Growing up, it was one of her dreams to become a musician. She met current band members Dan Gow and Will Ferri through a mutual friend.

She attended Immaculate Heart Academy in Washington Township, Bergen County, New Jersey.

She attended Fordham University between 2013 and 2014.

Career 
Costanza was introduced to Dan Gow and Will Ferri through a mutual friend in 2011, joining their band. Against The Current soon started to write original songs, whose lyrics were mostly written by Costanza. They also started to post covers of popular songs on YouTube. Against The Current released their first single "Thinking" in 2012. Meanwhile, Costanza made a self-titled YouTube channel and started posting beauty videos. During the summer of 2013, Against the Current went on tour with Alex Goot.

Against the Current released their first EP, Infinity in 2014. On June 6, Costanza made an appearance on Access Hollywood. In February 2015, Against The Current released their second EP, Gravity. At the end of April 2015, Against The Current had signed a record deal with Fueled by Ramen. At the end of August, they embarked on their first world tour, the "Gravity World Tour". Against The Current released their debut album In Our Bones on May 20, 2016. In May, following the release of their debut album, Costanza performed live with Alex Goot on his tour on several occasions. While they were in the UK, Against The Current was asked to play a last minute set at the Download Festival. Kerrang!, a UK-based magazine devoted to rock music, says that the band are "writing their future", and described Costanza as "Their Fearless Frontwoman". At the end of June, Rock Sound announced that Costanza would receive her own column in their monthly magazine to talk about Against The Current's debut album, writing her own lyrics for the band, touring, and giving advice on how aspiring bands can be successful.

Against the Current recorded the song "Legends Never Die" for the video game League of Legends, as a tie-in for the 2017 League of Legends World Championship. Against the Current released their second studio album, Past Lives in 2018. Against The Current returned to Reading and Leeds Festival  in August after which the band made their first appearances at Lollapalooza 2019  and Pentaport Rock Festival . Costanza collaborated with Cailin Russo on the song "Phoenix" for the 2019 League of Legends World Championship, which she then performed at the finals in Paris, France  and again on New Year's Eve at Bilibili New Years Eve Concert  in Beijing, China. Costanza performed the songs "Each Goal" and "Hero too" as the character Kyoka Jiro in the anime series My Hero Academia.

From July 2020 to May 2021, Costanza was the host of the show Guest House on streaming media channel VENN. At the end of 2020 Chrissy teamed up with the winners of the 2019 League of Legends World Championships FunPlus Phoenix to release "Phoenix" as their 2021 anthem (This song being different to the 2019 song used for the 2019 League of Legends World Championships with the same name).

On January 10, 2022, Against the Current collaborated with League of Legends European Championship for a song called "Wildfire", with casters Vedius and Drakos as guest vocals, which is a part of a promotion for the 2022 Spring Season of its said League of Legends esports regional league run.

Personal life 
In 2015, Costanza was in a relationship with Cameron Hurley of We Are the In Crowd. They broke up in 2019, which partly inspired the Against The Current song "that won't save us".

In February 2021, she started dating Tucker Roberts, president of Spectacor Gaming and son of Comcast CEO Brian L. Roberts. Costanza confirmed their relationship in September 2021. They currently live together in Los Angeles.

Discography

Studio albums with Against The Current

EPs with Against The Current

Solo Singles

Other appearances

References

External links 
 K!1620: AGAINST THE CURRENT – 2016’S HOTTEST BAND! Kerrang!. Retrieved 2016-05-17.
 MEET AGAINST THE CURRENT: FROM YOUTUBE TO YOUR NEXT OBSESSION fuse. Retrieved 2016-04-10.
 Chrissy Costanza on YouTube

1995 births
Living people
Immaculate Heart Academy alumni
Singer-songwriters from New Jersey
21st-century American singers
21st-century American women singers
American people of Italian descent
American women pop singers
American YouTubers
Beauty and makeup YouTubers
YouTube vloggers
American pop rock singers
Pop punk singers
American women singer-songwriters
Women punk rock singers